Phyllodesmium lembehense is a species of sea slug, an aeolid nudibranch, a marine gastropod mollusc in the family Facelinidae.

Distribution 
Known from the Lembeh strait, Sulawesi, Indonesia.

References

Facelinidae
Gastropods described in 2008